Ryan Anthony Rollins (born July 3, 2002) is an American professional basketball player for the Golden State Warriors of the National Basketball Association (NBA). He played college basketball for the Toledo Rockets.

Early life and high school career
Rollins was born and raised in Detroit, Michigan. He played basketball for Dakota High School in Macomb Township, Michigan. As a junior, he averaged 17.1 points, seven rebounds, 3.2 assists and 2.5 steals per game, missing the second half of the season with a hamstring injury. In his senior season, Rollins averaged 25.5 points, nine rebounds and five assists per game, earning second-team All-State honors from the Associated Press. A three-star recruit, he committed to playing college basketball for Toledo after the program prioritized him early in the recruiting process.

College career
Rollins immediately made an impact as a freshman at Toledo. He averaged 13.7 points, 5.2 rebounds and 2.5 assists per game, and was named Mid-American Conference (MAC) Freshman of the Year after helping his team win the MAC regular season title. Rollins assumed a leading role in his sophomore season with the transfer of Marreon Jackson. On November 24, 2021, he scored a career-high 35 points in a 79–70 victory over Coastal Carolina to win the Nassau Championship, where he was named tournament most valuable player. Rollins helped Toledo repeat as MAC regular season champions. As a sophomore, he averaged 18.9 points, six rebounds and 3.6 assists per game, earning first-team All-MAC honors. On April 7, 2022, Rollins declared for the 2022 NBA draft while maintaining his college eligibility. He opted to remain in the draft, forgoing his remaining college eligibility.

Professional career

Golden State Warriors (2022–present) 
In the 2022 NBA draft, Rollins was selected by the Atlanta Hawks with the 44th overall pick. He was later traded to the Golden State Warriors in exchange for the draft rights to Tyrese Martin, the 51st pick in the draft, and cash considerations. On July 28, 2022, Rolins signed his rookie contract with the Warriors. He did not play for the Warriors in the NBA Summer League due to a right foot injury.

On February 6, 2023, the Warriors announced that Rollins would undergo season-ending surgery to repair a Jones fracture of the fifth metatarsal in his right foot.

Career statistics

NBA

|-
| style="text-align:left;"| 
| style="text-align:left;"| Golden State
| 12 || 0 || 5.2 || .350 || .333 || 1.000 || 1.0 || .5 || .1 || .1 || 1.9
|- class="sortbottom"
| style="text-align:center;" colspan="2"| Career
| 12 || 0 || 5.2 || .350 || .333 || 1.000 || 1.0 || .5 || .1 || .1 || 1.9

College

|-
| style="text-align:left;"| 2020–21
| style="text-align:left;"| Toledo
| 30 || 30 || 30.2 || .431 || .323 || .786 || 5.2 || 2.5 || 1.1 || .1 || 13.7
|-
| style="text-align:left;"| 2021–22
| style="text-align:left;"| Toledo
| 34 || 34 || 32.7 || .468 || .311 || .802 || 6.0 || 3.6 || 1.7 || .3 || 18.9
|- class="sortbottom"
| style="text-align:center;" colspan="2"| Career
| 64 || 64 || 31.5 || .453 || .317 || .796 || 5.6 || 3.1 || 1.4 || .2 || 16.4

Personal life
Rollins' parents, mother Toni, father, Chris and brother Christopher. 

Christopher played college basketball for Davenport.

References

External links

Toledo Rockets bio

2002 births
Living people
American men's basketball players
Atlanta Hawks draft picks
Basketball players from Detroit
Golden State Warriors players
Shooting guards
Toledo Rockets men's basketball players